The 2015 English cricket season was the 116th in which the County Championship had been an official competition. It began in April with a round of university matches, and continued until the conclusion of a round of County Championship matches in late September. Three major domestic competitions were contested: the 2015 County Championship, the 2015 Royal London One-Day Cup and the 2015 NatWest t20 Blast.

During this season, two international teams toured England. New Zealand toured early in the summer, with Australia also touring later in the year. The latter tour saw England win The Ashes Test series 3–2; it was the 78th test series between the two sides.

Roll of honour
Test series
 England v New Zealand: 2 Tests - Series drawn 1–1
 England v Australia: 5 Tests - England won 3–2

ODI series
 England v New Zealand: 5 ODIs - England won 3–2
 England v Australia: 5 ODIs - Australia won 3-2

Twenty20 International series
 England v New Zealand: Only T20I - England won by 56 runs
 England v Australia: Only T20I - England won by 5 runs

County Championship
 Division One winners: Yorkshire
 Division One runners-up: Middlesex
 Division Two winners: Surrey

Royal London One-Day Cup
 Winners: Gloucestershire
 Runners-up: Surrey

Natwest t20 Blast
 Winners: Lancashire Lightning
 Runners-up: Hampshire

Minor Counties Championship 
 Winners: Cumberland
 Runners-up: Oxfordshire

MCCA Knockout Trophy
 Winners: Cornwall
 Runners-up: Northumberland

MCCA T20 Cup
 Winners: Cheshire
 Runners-up: Oxfordshire

Second XI Championship
 Winners: Nottinghamshire

Second XI Trophy
 Winners: Derbyshire

Second XI Twenty20
 Winners: Middlesex

Wisden Cricketers of the Year
 Moeen Ali, Gary Ballance, Adam Lyth, Angelo Mathews, Jeetan Patel

PCA Player of the Year
 Chris Rushworth

Ashes tour

County Championship

Divisions

Division One Standings
 Pld = Played, W = Wins, L = Losses, D = Draws, T = Ties, A = Abandonments, Bat = Batting points, Bowl = Bowling points, Ded = Deducted points, Pts = Points.

Division Two Standings
 Pld = Played, W = Wins, L = Losses, D = Draws, T = Ties, A = Abandonments, Bat = Batting points, Bowl = Bowling points, Ded = Deducted points, Pts = Points.

Royal London One-Day Cup

Group stage

Group A

Group B

Knockout stage

NatWest t20 Blast

Group stage

North Division

South Division

Knockout stage

References

 2015

Cricket season